
Gmina Dobrzyniewo Duże is a rural gmina (administrative district) in Białystok County, Podlaskie Voivodeship, in north-eastern Poland.

Villages
Gmina Dobrzyniewo Duże contains the villages and settlements of Bohdan, Borsukówka, Chraboły, Dobrzyniewo Duże, Dobrzyniewo Fabryczne, Dobrzyniewo Kościelne, Fasty, Gniła, Jaworówka, Kobuzie, Kopisk, Kozińce, Krynice, Kulikówka, Leńce, Letniki, Nowe Aleksandrowo, Nowosiółki, Obrubniki, Ogrodniki, Podleńce, Pogorzałki, Ponikła, Rybaki, Szaciły and Zalesie.

Neighbouring gminas
Gmina Dobrzyniewo Duże is bordered by the city of Białystok and by the gminas of Choroszcz, Czarna Białostocka, Knyszyn, Krypno, Tykocin and Wasilków.

References
Polish official population figures 2006

Dobrzyniewo Duze
Białystok County